Rafael Ortega (born 14 October 1953) is a Dominican Republic weightlifter. He competed in the men's flyweight event at the 1976 Summer Olympics.

References

1953 births
Living people
Dominican Republic male weightlifters
Olympic weightlifters of the Dominican Republic
Weightlifters at the 1976 Summer Olympics
Place of birth missing (living people)
20th-century Dominican Republic people